This is a list of notable members of Kappa Sigma (partially referenced in).

Government and politics

Current officeholders
John Boozman (Xi),  Senator, Arkansas (2010–); former U.S. Representative, Arkansas (2001–2010)
Richard Burr (Delta-Omega),  Senator, North Carolina (2005–); former U.S. Representative, North Carolina (1995–2005)
Michael P. Guest (Delta-Chi), U.S. Representative, Mississippi (2019–)
Ken Helm (Theta-Delta), Oregon State Representative (2015–)
Mike Layton, (Delta-Epsilon), City Councillor, Toronto (2010–)

Former presidential candidates
Robert J. Dole (Gamma-Omicron), former senator, Kansas (1969–1996); 1996 Republican Party Presidential Nominee

Former governors
Thomas L. Bailey (Alpha-Upsilon), former governor of Mississippi (1944–1946)
David M. Beasley (Kappa-Upsilon), former governor of South Carolina (1995–1999)
Millard F. Caldwell (Zeta), former governor of Florida (1945–1949)
Forrest C. Donnell (Beta-Gamma), former governor of Missouri (1945–1951)
Lee S. Dreyfus (Beta-Epsilon), former governor of Wisconsin (1979–1983)
Paul Fannin (Gamma-Rho), former governor of Arizona (1959–1965)
Frank Freyer (Alpha-Tau), former Naval Governor of Guam (1910–1911); Chief of Staff of the Peruvian Navy
Dwight Green (Alpha-Pi), former governor of Illinois (1941–1949)
Beauford H. Jester (Tau), former governor of Texas (1947–1949)
Joseph B. Johnson (Alpha-Lambda), former governor of Vermont (1955–1959)
John Ellis Martineau (Xi), former governor of Arkansas (1927–1928)
Robert Evander McNair (Chi-Omega), former governor of South Carolina (1965–1971)
Harry Nice (Alpha-Alpha), former governor of Maryland (1935–1939)
Paul E. Patton (Beta-Nu), former governor of Kentucky (1995–2003)
George C. Peery (Omicron), former governor of Virginia (1934–1938)
Sonny Perdue (Beta-Lambda), former governor of Georgia (2003–2011)
Xenophon Overton Pindall (Xi), former governor of Arkansas (1907–1908)
Ruffin G. Pleasant (Gamma), former governor of Louisiana (1916–1920)
James Hubert Price (Mu), former governor of Virginia (1938–1942)
David C. Treen (Sigma), former governor of Louisiana (1980–1984)

Former senators
Robert J. Dole (Gamma-Omicron), former senator, Kansas (1969–1996), served as minority and majority leader
Paul J. Fannin (Gamma-Rho), former senator, Arizona (1959–1987)
Estes Kefauver (Lambda), former senator, Tennessee (1949–1963)
John L. McClellan (Xi), former senator, Arkansas (1943–1977)
John G. Tower (Iota), former senator, Texas (1961–1985)

Former members of the House of Representatives
William V. Alexander (Xi), former Congressman, Arkansas (1966–1992)
Tom Allen (Alpha-Rho), former Congressman, Maine (1997–2009)
Ed Bethune (Xi), former Congressman, Arkansas (1979 –1985)
Dan Boren (Theta), former Congressman, Oklahoma (2005–2013)
Douglas H. Bosco (Theta-Delta), former Congressman, California (1983–1991)
Dante Fascell (Epsilon-Beta), former Congressman, Florida (1955–1993); former chairman of the House Foreign Affairs Committee
William Shields Goodwin (Xi), former Congressman, Arkansas (1911–1921)
Samuel B. Hill (Xi), former Congressman, Washington (1923–1936)
Frank Horton (Gamma), former Congressman, New York (1963–1993)
Robert Hurt (Upsilon), former Congressman, Virginia (2011–2017)
Ernest J. Istook, Jr. (Theta-Psi), former Congressman, Oklahoma (1993–2007)
Ken Lucas (Beta-Nu), former Congressman, Kentucky (1999–2005)
John L. McClellan (Xi), former Congressman, Arkansas (1932–1939)
Charlie Melancon (Epsilon-Chi), former Congressman, Louisiana (2005–2011)
John Murtha (Beta-Delta), former Congressman, Pennsylvania (1974–2010)
Archibald E. Olpp (Beta-Iota), former Congressman, New Jersey (1921–1923)
Vic Snyder (Theta-Delta), former Congressman, Arkansas (1997–2011)
Joe D. Waggonner (Epsilon-Gamma), former Congressman, Louisiana (1961–1978); former chairman of House Ways and Means Committee.

Judges and justices
William Lee Estes (Upsilon), judge of the United States District Court for the Eastern District of Texas (1920–1930)
H. F. Gierke III, (Delta-Mu), justice of the North Dakota Supreme Court (1983–1991); chief judge of the United States Court of Appeals for the Armed Forces  (1991–2006), chief Judge (2004–2006)
Edward H. Johnson, (Epsilon Omega), judge of the Georgia Court of Appeals, (1992–2010), chief judge (1999–2000)
David L. McCain (Delta-Delta), justice of the Supreme Court of Florida (1970–1975)
Steven W. Taylor, (Gamma-Psi), justice of the Supreme Court of Oklahoma (1994–), chief justice (2011–2013)
Edwin L. Pittman (Epsilon-Nu), justice of the Supreme Court of Mississippi (1989–2004), chief justice (2001–2004)

Former state and local officeholders
Bryce Bennett (Delta-Omicron), former Montana state senator (2019–2021), former Montana State Representative (2011–2019)
John M. Bransford, (Xi), former speaker of the Arkansas House of Representatives (1938–1942), former State Representative (1937–1942)
Lee Arthur Clayton, (Xi), former Arkansas treasurer (1961–1963)
G. Ernest Cunningham, (Xi), former speaker of the Arkansas House of Representatives (1987–89), former State Representative (1969–1996) 
Kevin Faulconer (Epsilon-Iota), current mayor of San Diego, California (2014–2020)
Ryan Gatti (Gamma), Louisiana State Senate (2016–2020)
John W. Greer, Jr. (Alpha), former member of the Georgia State Senate (1959–1960)
Matt Gurtler, (Rho Prime), former Georgia state representative (2017–2021)
Claris G. "Crip" Hall, (Xi), former Arkansas secretary of state (1937–1961)
James Berry King, (Xi), former Oklahoma attorney general (1931–1935)
J. C. Long (Gamma-Omicron), former member of the Kansas House of Representatives (1983–1993)
Lloyd C. McCuiston, Jr., (Xi), former speaker of the Arkansas House of Representatives (1981–1983), former state representative (1961–1994)
Dustin McDaniel (Xi), former Arkansas attorney general (2007–2015)
Wally Nesbitt (Delta-Epsilon), former member of Parliament of Canada (1953–1973)
Rob Patridge (Theta-Delta), former member of the Oregon House of Representatives (1999–2005)
Sam Reed (Gamma-Mu), Washington Secretary of State (2000–2013)
Barry Williamson (Xi), former Texas Railroad Commissioner (1993–1999)

Other political figures
Herman B. Baruch (Zeta), former Ambassador to the Netherlands and Portugal
John Ehrlichman (Delta Nu), Counsel and Assistant to the President for Domestic Affairs under President Richard Nixon
David E. Kendall (Alpha-Pi), Attorney to President Bill Clinton
William Gibbs McAdoo (Lambda), United States Secretary of the Treasury (1913–1918)
Larry M. Speakes (Delta-Xi), press secretary for President Ronald Reagan
Ardeshir Zahedi (Epsilon-Kappa), Iran's Ambassador to the United States and United Kingdom; Foreign Minister of Iran under Shah Mohammad Reza Pahlavi

Entertainers

Music
Bill Anderson (Beta-Lambda), singer and songwriter
Jimmy Buffett (Epsilon-Nu), singer, businessman best known for his Margaritaville franchise
Hoagy Carmichael (Beta-Theta), composer and movie star
AJ Castillo (Xi-Delta), Tejano recording artist, accordionist, singer, performer, and producer
Kevin Griffin (Gamma), lead singer and musician, Better Than Ezra
Josh Kelley (Delta-Xi), musician
Paul "P.H." Naffah (Rho), drummer, The Refreshments, Roger Clyne and the Peacemakers
Bobby Pulido (Lambda-Psi), musician, Tejano recording artist
Derek Andersen (Mu-Delta), EDM DJ and producer, part of the duo Slander
Scott Land (Mu-Delta), EDM DJ and producer, part of the duo Slander
Sam Vogel (Pi-Beta), EDM DJ and producer Jauz
Samuel Ramey (Gamma-Chi), operatic bass, actor

Film and television

Johnny Mack Brown (Beta), actor, Billy the Kid, many cowboy movies
John Brotherton (Gamma-Sigma), actor, Fuller House, The Conjuring, many other notable Film & TV appearances
Richard Crenna (Delta-Eta),  actor, Rambo
John Driscoll (Kappa Phi), actor, Guiding Light, The Young and the Restless
Chip Gaines (Lambda-Tau), owner of Magnolia Homes and HGTV Show, Fixer Upper
Chris Harrison (Theta Psi), actor, The Bachelor
Dennis Haskins (Alpha-Iota), actor, Saved By the Bell
Gordon Jump (Gamma-Chi), actor, WKRP in Cincinnati, portrayed the Maytag repairman
Wink Martindale (Epsilon-Pi), TV game show host
David Nelson (Delta Eta), actor, Ozzie and Harriet
Mark Neveldine (Delta-Phi), director, screenwriter, producer, actor Crank
Mike O'Malley (Beta-Kappa), actor, Yes, Dear, Nickelodeon GUTS, Glee
Robert Redford (Gamma-Tau), Academy Award-winning actor, director, founder of the Sundance Film Festival
Gailard Sartain (Epsilon-Mu), actor
Greg Smith (Theta-Beta), actor, Everwood
Kerr Smith (Alpha-Lambda), actor, Dawson's Creek
Michael C. Williams (Xi-Gamma), actor, The Blair Witch Project
Bill Wittliff (Tau), screenwriter, The Perfect Storm
Craig Conover (Kappa-Chi), actor, Southern Charm
Rick Selvage (Alpha Sigma), Executive Producer, The Wheel of Time'' (Television Series-Amazon)

Visual arts
Herblock (Alpha-Chi), cartoonist, Pulitzer Prize winner
Mort Walker (Beta-Gamma), cartoonist, Beetle Bailey
Gluyas Williams (Gamma-Eta), cartoonist, The New Yorker

Other
Evan Puschak (Mu-Psi), video essayist
Greg Raymer (Beta-Chi), winner World Series of Poker 2004
Daniel "Rudy" Ruettiger, motivational speaker, best known from the movie "Rudy"
Anthony Sadler (Nu-Lambda), defender of 2015 French train terrorist attack
Nick Wilson (Beta-Nu), winner Survivor Survivor season 37: David vs Goliath

Business

Craig Barrett (Beta-Zeta), Chairman and former CEO, Intel
Talmage Cooley (Zeta), Founder & CEO of Democracy.com
John Donahoe (Gamma-Epsilon), CEO of eBay & Nike
Robert Eaton (Gamma-Omicron), former chairman DaimlerChrysler AG
Mike Eskew (Chi), CEO, UPS
Gary Forsee (Beta-Chi), president and CEO of Sprint Nextel
Dan Fredinburg (Mu-Delta), Google executive
William Hewlett (Beta-Zeta), founder, Hewlett Packard
William Hinson (Alpha-Tau), Owner, WPHinson Trading
Richard Johnson (Alpha-Phi), Founder & President, HotJobs
Albert Bond Lambert (Zeta), early aviator, sponsor of The Spirit of St. Louis, namesake of Lambert International Airport
Robert Krebs (Beta-Zeta), former CEO, Burlington Northern

Robert W. Lundeen (Gamma-Sigma), Chairman of the Board, Dow Chemical
Scottie Mayfield (Alpha-Tau), president, Mayfield Dairy Farms
Nate Morris (Alpha-Eta), Co-Founder and CEO of Rubicon Global
Alan Mulally (Gamma-Omicron), former president and CEO Ford Motor Company
Bobby Murphy (Beta-Zeta), Co-Founder of Snapchat
John Olin (Alpha-Kappa), former chairman Olin Corporation
Spencer Truman Olin (Alpha-Kappa), executive Olin Corporation, philanthropist and Republican Party supporter.
John R. Patrick (Beta-Iota), former IBM vice president and innovative leader in the information technology industry
Richard Rainwater (Tau), Financier
Willard F. Rockwell (Alpha Delta), founder of Rockwell International
Cyrus R. Smith (Tau), former president of American Airlines
Jack Smith, Jr. (Gamma-Delta), president, General Motors
Evan Spiegel (Beta-Zeta), co-founder and CEO of Snapchat
Ted Turner (Beta-Alpha), media mogul (TNT, TBS, CNN, Atlanta Braves)
Todd Wagner (Beta-Theta), Broadcast.com co-founder

Journalism

Richard Allin (Omega), author/ journalist, Arkansas Gazette
Marquis Childs (Beta-Rho), journalist, St. Louis Post-Dispatch
Dan Dierdorf (Beta-Gamma), sports commentator, former NFL player
Sam Donaldson (Epsilon-Xi), Journalist ABC News
Steve Kroft (Gamma-Iota), Journalist, 60 Minutes
Stewart Mandel (Epsilon-Delta), Journalist Sports Illustrated
Craig Melvin (Alpha-Nu), Journalist / Broadcaster NBC
Edward R. Murrow (Gamma-Mu), Broadcasting Legend
Drew Pearson (Pi), American columnist
Lowell Thomas (Beta-Omicron), Journalist, Commentator

Academics
Steven C. Beering (Chi), former president, Purdue University
Bryan Coker (Phi), president, Maryville College
Alexander Bondurant (Upsilon), Classicist and Educator, University of Mississippi
William Cade (Tau), president, University of Lethbridge, behavioral ecologist
Paul Farmer  (Eta Prime), Award-winning humanitarian, M.D PhD
Gary Forsee  (Beta-Chi), president, University of Missouri System
John C. Futrall  (Xi), president, University of Arkansas, 1913-1939
Christian Gauss (Alpha-Zeta), literary critic and former professor, Princeton University
Ernest Hartsock (Alpha), former professor of poetics, Oglethorpe University
John Herbert Hollomon Jr. (Gamma-Pi), former president, University of Oklahoma; Metallurgist; Former Assistant Secretary, United States Department of Commerce
Manley Ottmer Hudson (Alpha-Omega), former professor, Harvard University
William N. Ruud (Delta-Mu), president, Shippensburg University
Paul Rudolph (Beta-Eta), former Dept. Chair, Architecture, Yale University
John W. Ryan (Delta-Sigma), president emeritus, Indiana University
D. M. Smith (Kappa), chair, mathematics, Georgia Institute of Technology
Lyon Gardiner Tyler (Zeta), former president, College of William & Mary

Science and medicine

Lee Berger (Kappa), Paleoanthropologist and National Geographic Explorer, awarded the First National Geographic Prize for Research and Exploration
John Covert Boyd (Zeta), designated by President Theodore Roosevelt to incorporate the American National Red Cross, one of five founders and original members of Kappa Sigma
Denton Cooley (Tau), Founder, Texas Heart Institute, performed first heart transplant in the United States
Dr. Ernest William Goodpasture (Kappa), American pathologist and physician
Irvine W. Grote (Alpha-Iota) University of Tennessee at Chattanooga. Noted Chemist and inventor of Rolaids.
Edwin Hubble (Gamma-Beta), astronomer, namesake of Hubble Space Telescope
Edgar D. Mitchell (Delta-Alpha), Astronaut and Lunar Module Pilot on Apollo 14, the sixth person to walk on the Moon
Gen. Samuel C. Phillips (Delta-Gamma) University of Wyoming.  NASA Apollo Program Director.
Lore Alford Rogers, USDA dairy scientist and bacteriologist.

Sports

Baseball
Fred Beebe (Alpha-Gamma), pitcher (1906–1916)
Boyd Cypert (Xi), 3rd Baseman (1914)
Chuck Dobson (Gamma-Omicron), pitcher (1966–1975)
Boo Ferriss (Delta-Chi), pitcher (1945–1950)
Gerry Hannahs (Xi), pitcher (1976–79)
Carl Lundgren (Alpha-Gamma), pitcher (1902–1909)
Big Jeff Pfeffer (Alpha-Gamma), pitcher (1905–1911)
Steve Rogers (Epsilon-Mu), pitcher (1973–1985)
Cecil Upshaw Jr. (Epsilon), pitcher (1966–1975)

Basketball
Rick Barry (Epsilon-Beta), (1965–1980) Hall of Fame

Football
Jim Benton (Xi), wide receiver, played 9 years for the Cleveland Rams and Chicago Bears. All-America in 1937, he was a member of the NFL 1940s All-Decade Team. Benton was the first NFL receiver to gain more than 300 yards in a game, a record that stood for 40 years.
Tommy Casanova (Gamma), safety (1974–1977) Pro Bowl
Richard Cunningham (Xi), linebacker, center and offensive tackle, (1967–73) Buffalo Bills, Houston Oilers, and Philadelphia Eagles
Richie Cunningham (Epsilon-Chi), kicker (1997–2002) Pro Bowl
Tay Gowan (Lambda-Epsilon), cornerback, (2021–Present)                                                                                                                                                                 
Howard Harpster (Delta-Alpha), quarterback College Football Hall of Fame
Ted Hendricks (Epsilon-Beta), defensive end, (1969–1983) Pro Football Hall of Fame
James Kent Hull (Delta-Chi), center, (1983–1996) Pro Bowl
Bert Jones (Gamma), quarterback, (1973–1982) Pro Bowl
Greg Landry (Gamma-Delta), quarterback, (1968–1984) Pro Bowl
Jim Lindsey (Xi), Half-Back, played for the Minnesota Vikings from 1966 to 1972, including Super Bowl IV against the Kansas City Chiefs.
John Michelosen (Gamma-Omega), quarterback, (1933–1937); head coach of Pittsburgh Steelers (1948–1951); head coach of Pitt (1955–1965)
Elmer Oliphant (Chi), Purdue and West Point football player
Steve Owens (Gamma-Kappa), (1970–1974) 1969 Heisman Trophy Winner
Dick Schafrath (Alpha-Sigma), offensive lineman, (1959–1971) Pro Bowl
Clyde Scott (Xi), All-American halfback, College Football Hall of Fame, Olympic silver medalist in the 1948 Summer Olympics.  The 8th player overall chosen in the 1948 NFL Draft, Scott played five seasons in the National Football League for the Philadelphia Eagles and the Detroit Lions, appearing on two NFL championship teams.
Brian Sipe (Epsilon-Iota), quarterback (1974–1983) 1980 MVP
Jerry Stovall (Gamma), running back (1963–1971), Pro Bowl; head coach of LSU (1980–1983)
Brian Young (Epsilon-Xi), defensive tackle (2000–2008)

Golf
Jay Haas (Delta-Omega), professional golfer (1976–)
Peter Jacobsen (Gamma-Alpha), professional golfer (1976–)
Albert Bond Lambert (Zeta), Amateur golfer and namesake of Lambert–St. Louis International Airport
Curtis Strange (Delta Omega), professional golfer (1976–) World Golf Hall of Fame
Lanny Wadkins (Delta-Omega), professional golfer (1971–) World Golf Hall of Fame
Robert Wrenn (golfer) (Delta-Omega), professional golfer (1982–1998) 1987 Buick Open Winner

Racing

Ryan Ellis (Kappa-Phi), NASCAR Xfinity Series driver
Chris Festa (Epsilon-Sigma), Firestone Indy Light driver
Phil Hill (Delta-Eta), Formula One driver

Coaches, executives and owners
William Alexander (Alpha-Tau), head football coach Georgia Tech (1920–1944)
Dwight Beede (Delta-Alpha), coach at Youngstown State University and inventor of the penalty flag (1937–1972)
Cam Cameron (Beta-Theta), head NFL football coach (2007); head football coach Indiana University (1997–2001)
Lloyd Carr (Beta-Gamma), head football coach University of Michigan (1995–2007)
Fisher DeBerry (Alpha-Nu), head football coach Air Force Academy(1984–2006)
Hec Edmundson (Gamma-Theta), basketball coach University of Washington (1920–1947)
Ron Guenther (Alpha-Gamma), former athletic director University of Illinois (1992–2011)
George Huff (Alpha-Gamma), manager of Boston Red Sox (1907); Athletic Director at University of Illinois (1901–1935)
Lamar Hunt (Delta-Pi), owner, Kansas City Chiefs, Columbus Crew, Kansas City Wizards, and F.C. Dallas Founder of the American Football League, Co founder North American Soccer League, and Major League Soccer Pro Football Hall of Fame
Jerry Jones (Xi), owner, Dallas Cowboys
Jimmye Laycock (Nu), head football coach (1980–) College of William & Mary
George J. Maloof, Jr. (Kappa-Alpha), former co-owner of the Sacramento Kings and Palms Hotel and Casino.
Rollie Massimino (Alpha-Lambda), head basketball coach at Villanova University
Andy MacPhail (Beta-Pi), president of baseball operations (2007–)
Branch McCracken (Beta-Theta), head basketball coach Indiana University Basketball Hall of Fame
Charlie Monfort (Delta-Sigma), owner, Colorado Rockies
Dan Peterson (Alpha-Gamma), head basketball coach University of Delaware, Chile National Team, Bologna Virtus, Milan Olimpia
Erk Russell (Beta-Eta), head football coach (1964–1969) University of Georgia, Georgia Southern University
Steve Sabol (Beta-Omega), president of NFL Films
Ray Tanner (Chi-Omega), head baseball coach University of South Carolina (1997–2012), Director of Athletics University of South Carolina (2012–present)
Norm Van Brocklin (Gamma-Alpha), quarterback, football coach Pro Football Hall of Fame
Tad Wieman (Alpha-Zeta), head football coach University of Michigan (1927–1928) College Football Hall of Fame
Bob Zuppke (Alpha-Gamma), head football coach University of Illinois (1913–1941) College Football Hall of Fame

Other
Ray Barbuti (Gamma-Iota), Olympic runner
Scott Davidson (Xi-Lambda), professional table tennis player
Francis Hunter, professional tennis player, Olympic medalist
Denis Margalik (Xi-Nu), figure skater
Gus Sonnenberg (Gamma-Epsilon), world heavyweight champion
 Dr. Robert Steadward (Epsilon-Alpha), founding president of the International Paralympic Committee; Officer of the Order of Canada
Louis Zamperini  (Delta-Eta), Olympic runner, WWII POW, inspirational speaker
Eriq Zavaleta (Beta-Theta), Soccer player for the Seattle Sounders (2013–present)

Military
 Captain Edward Allworth (Gamma-Sigma), U.S. Army. Medal of Honor recipient.
 General Burwell B. Bell (Alpha-Iota), U.S. Army
Colonel Jason Bothwell (Theta-Zeta), U.S. Army. Program Director of the Year for 2016 from the Emergency Medicine Residents’ Association.
 Corporal Kyle Carpenter (Chi-Omega), U.S. Marine Corps. Medal of Honor recipient.
 Major General Frank L. Culin Jr. (Gamma-Rho), U.S. Army. World War II commander of the 87th Infantry Division.
 Captain Frank Freyer (Alpha-Tau), 14th Naval Governor of Guam; Chief of Staff of the Peruvian Navy
 Vice Admiral William E. Gortney (Lambda-Lambda), Commander, U.S. Naval Forces Central Command
 Admiral Cary T. Grayson (Nu), United States Navy surgeon, Chairman of the American Red Cross
 General Paul V. Hester (Delta-Xi), Commander, Pacific Air Forces
 Colonel Thomas George Lanphier, Jr. (Beta-Zeta), World War II fighter pilot
 Lieutenant General Richard C. Mangrum (Beta-Psi), first Marine Aviator to receive the "Gray Eagle Award"
 Lieutenant General Hal Moore (Alpha-Eta), U.S. Army. Distinguished Service Cross recipient
 General Samuel C. Phillips (Delta-Gamma), Commander, Air Force Systems Command from 1973 to 1975
 Lieutenant Commander Gordon Arthur Stanley (Gamma-Alpha), U.S. Navy ace

Man of the Year
Every year, the Supreme Executive Committee of Kappa Sigma selects one notable alumnus as Man of the Year.  Those selected are figures who have made significant public contributions in areas including politics, the military, entertainment, sports, etc.

References

External links
Man of the Year list on Kappa Sigma Website

Members
Lists of members of United States student societies